Dummy is the name of different fictional characters appearing in American comic books published by DC Comics.

Publication history
The original Dummy first appears in Leading Comics #1 and was created by Mort Weisinger and Mort Meskin. He is not to be confused with Scarface, the ventriloquist dummy/alter-ego operated by Arnold Wesker. In addition to his Leading Comics appearances, the Dummy fought the Vigilante in six Golden Age stories: Action Comics #58 (March 1943), #63 (August 1943), #69 (February 1944), #75 (August 1944), #87 (August 1945) and #96 (May 1946); although the Vigilante remained a regular Action Comics feature until issue #198 (November 1954), issue #96 was the Dummy's final appearance for many years.

The second, known as Danny the Dummy, first appears in Batman #134 (Sept 1960) and was created by Bill Finger and Sheldon Moldoff.

Fictional character biographies

Original Dummy

The Dummy is an archenemy of the Golden Age era Vigilante, and a skilled inventor of weapons. As the leader of a criminal gang, the Dummy pretends to be a ventriloquist's dummy through whom the gang's supposed "true" leader conveys instructions, the gang never suspecting that the Dummy himself is their leader. The Dummy's secret identity is never revealed; in fact, it is never made clear whether the Dummy is a very short human being or an actual wooden dummy that has somehow been brought to life. The Dummy was a member of a group of villains brought together by the Hand to cause crimes around the nation, which led to the first case of the Seven Soldiers of Victory; his particular efforts were prevented by the Vigilante, with whom he had apparently already clashed in untold stories, since he was already a known Vigilante enemy.

Dummy later escapes from prison with the help of his large companion Bobo. Then he and Bobo worked on a crime spree that involved them robbing the Jeweler's Exchange. When the package was opened, Dummy posed as a mechanical toy to fool the owners until he used knock-out gas. Both of them were defeated by Vigilante and Stuff the Chinatown Kid where they surrendered to the police.

In his latest racket, Dummy has his minion Flipper pose as a ventriloquist where they got gigs at high society shows. While Flipper used a look-alike of Dummy which Stuff the Chinatown Kid identified, the real Dummy was operating in the crowd. After breaking out of their respectful traps, Vigilante and Stuff defeated Dummy and Flipper and handed them over to the police.

The Dummy returned to challenge the Seven Soldiers on his own.

Dummy later shrinks himself and his henchmen to small size in order to get onto a cargo train. When the shrinkage wears off, they rob the train and make their getaway. Despite being affected by the shrink ray, Vigilante and Stuff the Chinatown Kid turn the tables on Dummy and his henchmen who are then handed over to the police.

The Dummy was shown to be responsible for the death of the Vigilante's sidekick Stuff the Chinatown Kid.

The Dummy also appears in All-Star Squadron, where he is recruited for Mister Mind's Monster Society of Evil. In the course of this storyline, the Dummy passes through Green Lantern's energy force-field unimpeded, implying that the Dummy is made of wood (which would make him immune to Scott's power) and is indeed a living ventriloquist's dummy.

In modern times, the Dummy returned and took over the criminal organization Injustice Unlimited to battle Infinity, Inc.

After the reality alteration caused by the Crisis on Infinite Earths, the 1995-1996 miniseries Vigilante: City Lights, Prairie Justice (1995–1996) depicts Stuff having been killed by mobster Bugsy Siegel and not Dummy. During a fight with Vigilante, Dummy dies by falling off a cat walk onto a lit spotlight.

In DC Rebirth, a new depiction of Dummy is seen. This version is described by Mister Mind to be a Victorian man who was turned into a wooden dummy by a wizard's curse and was imprisoned in a location in the Magiclands called the Monsterlands following a fight with the "heroes of yesterday". Dummy introduces himself as Exile #413 and directs Mister Mind and Doctor Sivana to a boat that would take them to the Dungeon of Eternity. He cannot go with them to the Dungeon of Eternity because he cannot deal with water, due to him being made of wood. When the Monster Society of Evil was freed, Dummy had to swim to the Dungeon of Eternity and was displeased that he was left behind, as Mister Mind promised him freedom. Superboy-Prime states to Dummy that he can get him out in exchange for removing the little red sun outside of his prison. Dummy does so and is double-crossed by Superboy-Prime, who uses his heat beams on Dummy.

Danny the Dummy

Danny the Dummy, a pint-sized ventriloquist in a top hat and suit, has a hit act in which he plays the dummy to a normal-sized "ventriloquist" named Matt (who is revealed as the real dummy at the end of each show). But the fact that people invariably refer to Danny as "the Dummy" infuriates him, and inspires him to use dummies for crime to make dummies out of the law.

Powers and abilities
The original Dummy was a skilled inventor. He wields a cane in battle that can fire powerful force beams.

In other media

Television
The first incarnation of the Dummy makes minor non-speaking appearances in Justice League Unlimited as a member of Gorilla Grodd's Secret Society.

Film
 The first incarnation of the Dummy makes a cameo appearance at the end of Justice League: The New Frontier.
 The first incarnation of the Dummy appears in Lego DC: Shazam!: Magic and Monsters, voiced by James Arnold Taylor. This version is a member of the Monster Society of Evil.

Miscellaneous
The first incarnation of the Dummy appears in a flashback depicted in issue #4 of the Arrowverse tie-in comic miniseries Earth-Prime, in which he joins several supervillains in fighting Pat Dugan and the Star-Spangled Kid.

References

External links
 Dummy at DC Comics Wiki
 Dummy II at DC Comics Wiki

DC Comics supervillains
Comics characters introduced in 1941
Comics characters introduced in 1960
Characters created by Mort Weisinger
Fictional inventors
Vigilante characters in comics